Xystophora is a genus of moths in the family Gelechiidae.

Species
 Xystophora asthenodes (Meyrick, 1923)
 Xystophora carchariella (Zeller, 1839)
 Xystophora chengchengenis Li & Zheng, 1998
 Xystophora defixa (Meyrick, 1929)
 Xystophora ingentidentalis Li & Zheng, 1998
 Xystophora kostjuki Bidzilya, 2000
 Xystophora mongolica Emelyanov & Piskunov, 1982
 Xystophora novipsammitella Li & Zheng, 1998
 Xystophora parvisaccula Li & Zheng, 1998
 Xystophora psammitella (Snellen, 1884)
 Xystophora pulveratella (Herrich-Schaffer, 1854)

Selected former species
Xystophora rufulella Snellen, 1884

References

 , 2000: New records of gelechiid moths from the Southern Siberia with description of three new species. Beiträge zur Entomologie 50 (2): 385-395.
 , 2010: The gelechiid fauna of the southern Ural Mountains, part I: descriptions of seventeen new species (Lepidoptera: Gelechiidae). Zootaxa 2366: 1-34. Abstract: http://www.mapress.com/zootaxa/2010/f/z02366p034f.pdf].

 
Gelechiini